The Chillout Project: Sisters Of The Sun is the seventh volume of Anton Ramos' The Chillout Project series, which features soothing female vocals and sunset music.

Track listing
 The Paul Schwartz Project - Earthbound
 Lol Hammond - Dust
 Bliss - Evening Sun
 Afterlife - Speck Of Gold
 Cellar 55 - With Or Without You
 Mandalay - Another
 Dzihan And Kamien - Drophere
 Cassandra Wilson - Harvest Moon
 Almadrava - If You Could See My Eyes
 Chungking - Following
 Carlos Gallardo Y Duende - Aire Y Olas
 Bent - Sing Me
 Fragile State - Song Of Departure
 Caia - Remembrance

2005 compilation albums
The Chillout Project albums